Jiribam (Meitei pronunciation:/jee-ree-baam/) is a municipal council in the Jiribam district of the state of Manipur, India. It is one of the fastest-growing towns in Manipur.

The town is located on the state's westernmost boundary, adjoining the Cachar district of Assam. It is also known as the western gate of Manipur. Jiribam town is inhabited by the Meiteis, Bengalis, and various other communities.

History

The recorded history of Jiribam began during the British colonial period. At the beginning of the 19th century, several tribes and religious groups began to migrate to the area along the Jiri River. During this era, the Jiri River was a famous landmark and Jiribam was a major trade center. The area was ruled by Maharaja Meidingngu Churachand from 1891 to 1941; he was a minor at the time of his ascendancy. In 1907, the Manipur State Durbar was established to assist the Maharaja in the administration of the area. Churachand's son, the Maharaja Bodhchandra Singh, ruled the area from 1941 to 1955.
Following independence from the United Kingdom, an agreement was signed on 2 September 1949 between the government of India and the Maharaja of Manipur. As a result of this agreement, the region of Manipur was merged with India on 15 October 1949. After the enactment of the Union Territories Act of 1956, Manipur became one of the Union Territories. Imphal was then declared as the state capital.

In 2017, a Manipur Legislative Assembly election candidate from the Bengali community, Md Ashab Uddin, became the first member of the Jiribam minority community to win an election.

Geography

Climate

Jiribam's climate is humid subtropical which is characterized by short winters and long summers with heavy rainfall. Some areas may experience snowfall during the winter months. As are many areas in India, Jiribam is subject to powerful monsoons.

Jiribam lies under the direct influence of southwest monsoon season and rainfall is abundant compared to other places in the state. About twenty to thirty percent of annual rainfall occurs during the pre-monsoon season in the month of May. About sixty to seventy percent of rainfall occurs in the rainy season which runs from the second half of June to September.

Jiribam is humid with a moderately hot temperature. The months of May and June are the hottest. The temperature is very pleasant in autumn, which falls around September to November. The lowest temperatures are recorded from the second half of December to the first half of January where temperatures can fall below  at late night. However, days are comfortably warm even in this period.

Demographics
 India census, Jiribam had a population of 6,426. Males constitute 49 percent of the population and females 51 percent. Jiribam has an average literacy rate of 73 percent, which is higher than the national average of 59.5 percent. Male literacy is 80 percent while female literacy is 66 percent. In Jiribam, 13 percent of the population is less than six years of age.

Politics
Jiribam is part of the Outer Manipur (Lok Sabha constituency).

Economy
The Jiribam town is the administrative headquarters of the subdivision. It is also a growth centre, which provides medical, educational and commercial facilities in and around the region. According to the 2001 census, 80 percent of its working population is engaged in non-agricultural activities and the main function of the town is categorized as "services". About 20 percent of the population are government employees, which provides more income than other sectors.

Transport
Jiribam railway station was the first railway station in Manipur. This station provides connectivity to Silchar. Jiribam will be connected to Imphal through 111 kilometer Jiribam-Tupul-Imphal railway line.
After the commissioning of the line important trains like the Rajdhani Express, superfast trains will pass through it.

Notes

References 

Cities and towns in Jiribam district
Jiribam district